TV 2 Nyhetene is Norway's TV 2 regular news that has been shown every day since the start of 1992, at 18:30 and at 21:00. There used to be a shorter newscast that ran around midnight, but ended around the time TV 2 Nyheter started. The 21:00 news was voted the Gullruten 2004 best current affairs program (news, sports and debate).

News readers
Siri Lill Mannes
Sturla Dyregrov
Pål T. Jørgensen
Espen Fiveland
Mah-Rukh Ali
Kjetil H. Dale
Morten Sandøy
Christine Korme

Former news readers
Connie Barr (1992–2001)
Nils Gunnar Lie
Jarl Borgvin Dørre

External links
 TV 2 News's website

Norwegian television news shows
TV 2 (Norway) original programming
1992 Norwegian television series debuts
1990s Norwegian television series
2000s Norwegian television series
2010s Norwegian television series
2020s Norwegian television series